Mickaël Pagis (born 17 August 1973) is a French former professional footballer who played as a forward. He is a beach soccer player.

Career
Pagis' nickname is "Pagistral", based on his name and the French word "magistral" (brilliant). A firm favourite at Strasbourg, he scored many goals and was the club's top goal scorer in the 2004–05 season.

The brightest moment of his career came in a game against the defending champions Olympique Lyonnais on 5 October 2008, when he scored a hat-trick.

Pagis plays beach soccer for the France national team. He recently scored a hat-trick against Russia.

Personal life
Pagis is the father of the French footballer Pablo Pagis.

Honours
Sochaux
 Coupe de la Ligue: 2004
 Ligue 2: 2001

Strasbourg
 Coupe de la Ligue: 2005

Individual
 Ligue 2 top scorer: 2000

References

External links
 Mickaël Pagis' profile, stats & pics

1973 births
Living people
Sportspeople from Angers
Association football forwards
French footballers
Stade Lavallois players
Nîmes Olympique players
FC Sochaux-Montbéliard players
RC Strasbourg Alsace players
Olympique de Marseille players
Stade Rennais F.C. players
Ligue 1 players
Ligue 2 players
Championnat National players
Gazélec Ajaccio players
SO Châtellerault players
French beach soccer players
Footballers from Pays de la Loire